Swift River is a settlement in the Canadian territory of Yukon, primarily a service stop on the Alaska Highway at historical mile 733. The radius of the area is estimated to be about ). The only permanent population owns and operates, or is employed at, the area's commercial highway establishment. Other residents are transient, working at the Yukon government's highway maintenance camp.

Demographics 

References 

Settlements in Yukon